Bolognano is a comune (municipality) and town in the province of Pescara in the Abruzzo region of Italy.

References

Cities and towns in Abruzzo